The Princess of Flames is a novel by Ru Emerson published in 1986.

Plot summary
The Princess of Flames is a novel in which King Sedry and his brother Hyrcan fight the Fegez hordes, who are allied with their sister Elfrid who seeks to revenge the overthrow of their father.

Reception
Dave Langford reviewed The Princess of Flames for White Dwarf #89, and stated that "It's as though Emerson had written a novel of semi-historical warfare and was advised to 'fantasy it up a bit'."

Reviews
Review by Debbie Notkin (1985) in Locus, #299 December 1985
Review by Charles de Lint (1985) in Fantasy Review, December 1985

References

1986 novels